The Tel Aviv Stock Exchange (TASE; ; colloquially known as The Bursa) is Israel's only public stock exchange and a public company that has been traded on the Tel-Aviv Stock Exchange since August 1, 2019. Legally, the exchange is regulated by the Securities Law (1968), and is under the direct supervision of the Israel Securities Authority (ISA).

TASE plays a major role in the Israeli economy, and the 23 TASE members are major banks and investment houses. Trading on TASE is conducted solely through the TASE members that collect a fee for the services they provide. TASE serves to trade securities and to raise capital and debt for companies and the government on the Israeli capital market.

History and milestones 

The Tel Aviv Stock Exchange was established in 1953. Even prior to this, commencing in 1935, securities trading was carried out in the Land of Israel and, afterwards, in the State of Israel at the mandate-period Anglo-Palestine Bank (today, Bank Leumi). The trade was conducted at the bank, in the office of Mordechai Pinchas Hasson, an Israeli banker who was one of the founders of the Exchange Bureau of Securities and the CEO of Bank Leumi. In the office that served as the stock exchange, daily trading within the framework of the "Exchange Bureau of Securities" lasted for just one hour. Among those that conceived the original idea were bankers who had immigrated from Germany such as Max Kollenscher and his brother Leo. In 1968, TASE activity was regulated by law and the Israel Securities Authority, which supervises TASE activity, was established.

In 1983, TASE was hit by the bank stock crisis, during which the share price of Israel's four largest banks collapsed – resulting in the state's nationalization of the banks and a third of the public's investment in them being wiped out. In the same year, TASE moved from its premises at 113 Allenby Street to a building at 54 Ahad Ha'Am Street, Tel Aviv. In 1993, trade in derivatives commenced. In 1999, TASE brought down the curtain on the trading floors era and completed the changeover to fully automated trading making use of a "continuous" trading system (TACT). In 2000, the Knesset passed Amendment No. 21 to the Securities Law, which makes it easier for companies whose shares are listed in the United States, to also list in Tel Aviv ("dual listing"). In July 2005, dual listing was expanded to include companies listed on the London Stock Exchange's Main Market and the Nasdaq Small Cap Market. Today, tens of dual-listed companies are traded on TASE (being listed in Tel Aviv and on overseas exchanges, in parallel). In 2005, market makers began operating on TASE. In 2007, the annual volume of securities and convertibles hit a new record of NIS 593.2 billion.

Since 2008, against the backdrop of the global economic crisis, the tightening of the regulatory regime in which TASE operates (by the Israel Securities Authority, the Capital Market, Insurance and Savings Division at the Israeli Ministry of Finance, the Anti-Money Laundering Authority, etc.) and other factors, the number of trading participants and trading volumes have become less significant. In 2012, the annual volume of securities and convertibles amounted to just NIS 265.1 billion (a 54% decrease) – the lowest volume since 2004.

In 2016, TASE  launched an analysis project for high-tech companies, within the framework of which the international research company, Frost and Sullivan, publishes informational and financial analyses regarding technology and biomed companies that are listed on TASE.

In 2017, the TASE indices underwent a reform – "the diffusion reform", which had several objectives, including: improving the stability of the TASE indices, broadening the sectoral diffusion within the various indices, setting more stringent threshold terms for the flagship indices and easing the threshold terms for the other indices, encouraging foreign investors to invest in the TASE indices, significantly increasing the free float rate for the shares included in the flagship indices, fully realizing the potential of small and medium company shares, and enlarging the infrastructure for launching new indices. At the beginning of 2017, the Knesset passed the second and third readings of a law for TASE's demutualization, which created the outline for turning it into a for-profit company.

In April 2017, the Knesset passed an amendment of the Securities Law enabling changes to TASE's ownership structure; in September 2017 the District Court ratified the TASE demutualization arrangement, enabling changes to TASE's ownership structure, whereby TASE became a for-profit company, while separating the ownership and control of TASE from membership therein. The Israel Securities Authority has regulatory oversight over TASE's operations, as well as over the Tel-Aviv Clearing House, the MAOF Clearing House and the Tel-Aviv Stock Exchange Nominee Company, which are wholly owned subsidiaries of TASE.

In 2018, the Nominee Company was established as a private subsidiary of TASE. The Nominee Company is engaged in two main areas of activity: it ensures the proper and complete registration of the number of securities registered in its name (held by the public) and serves as a conduit for the transfer of payments deriving from corporate actions (such as dividends, interest) between the issuing companies and the end-holders of the securities. In August 2018, the Israel Securities Authority approved] the sale of 71.7% of TASE's shares to five groups of foreign investors. On August 1, 2019, trade in TASE shares commenced on the Tel-Aviv Stock Exchange.

The 2007 indices reform

At the beginning of 2017, TASE carried out a comprehensive reform of the security indices listed on it and established new indices. Among the principal changes made by the reform was expanding the number of shares included in each index and lowering a share's maximum weighing in an index. For instance, the Tel Aviv 25 Index, which was considered TASE's flagship index was expanded from 25 to 35 shares, with its name being changed to the TA- 35 Index, accordingly. The maximum weighting for a share in the Index was reduced from 10% to 7%. One of the main objectives of the reform was to reduce the level of concentration in the indices. Since more than 70% of the Index's weighting related to just 10 shares, a sharp change in the value of just one of these would cause the Index to react dramatically, and the Index was considered to be too concentrated.

As part of the reform, new indices were created with the aim of raising investors' interest in TASE and increasing activity thereon. The new indices that were created are: the TA-BlueChip15Price, the TA-SME150 and the TA Rimon indices.

TASE members 
The Israeli Stock Exchange has 23 members

The central Bank of Israel

TASE's home 
In 1960, TASE moved to its own premises in the "Passage" at 113 Allenby Street in Tel Aviv and, in February 1983, TASE moved premises to 54 Ahad Ha'Am Street in Tel Aviv. In 2001, a Visitors Centers was opened on the historic trading floors of the TASE building. Educational visits took place in the Visitors Center, as well as conventions and events associated with the capital market[

On July 24, 2014, TASE moved to its new home on the corner of Montefiore Street and Ahuzat Bayit Street, close to the Shalom Meir Tower. The TASE complex stands on a one and a half dunam plot that was acquired by it in 2007 at a cost of NIS 58 million and construction took five years. The 14 story building tops out at 60 meters and has 22,600 m2 of floor space. The nonstandard ratio between the number of stories and the building's height is due to the building having stories with high ceilings, such as the ground floor that rises to a height of 10 meters.

Growth
In 1993 TASE had the third largest number of IPOs of all the world stock exchanges.

In 2005, non-Israeli investment in TASE reached an all-time high of NIS 2 billion, while the TA-25 increased 34%. By the end of the year foreign investment banks UBS, Deutsche Bank, and HSBC had become members of TASE.

In 2007, trading averaged $500 million a day, a 55% increase over the previous year. The number of exchange-traded funds (ETFs) grew to 240. The Tel Bond-20 index was also launched that year. The TA-25 rose 175% in the period 2004–07.

In May 2008 Northern Trust started the first US exchange-traded fund on the NYSE based on TASE's benchmark, the TA-25 Index.

Performance

As of May 25, 2010, TASE's largest stocks by market capitalization were Teva Pharmaceutical Industries ($51.5 billion), Israel Chemicals ($14.3bn), Bank Leumi ($6.1bn), and Bezeq ($6.0bn). Daily turnover of shares and convertibles in 2009 was US$432 million, $1,035M of bonds and exchange-traded notes (ETNs), $163M of T-bills, and 252,000 options and futures contracts. Total market capitalization at the end of 2009 was $189bn shares and convertibles, $174bn government and corporate bonds, and $23bn T-bills, a total of $386bn. On April 25, 2010, TASE's benchmark TA-25 index reached a record high of 1,239 points.

For the decade ending 12 February 2012, the TA–25 index topped the Bloomberg Riskless Return Ranking list, outperforming 23 other developed-nation benchmark indexes when adjusting for volatility.

CEO Ester Levanon resigned on 18 July 2013, effective 31 December 2013. A week later, on 25 July 2013, Chairman Saul Bronfeld resigned. According to Bloomberg, the executives' decisions follow a drop in trading volume and the bourse's failed bid to join MSCI Inc.'s Europe Index. Bronfeld, who served as chairman since 2006, cited the "hostile control" by the Israel Securities Authority and the regulator's interference in the executive management of the bourse as the main reasons for his resignation.

Increase in trading volumes in 2020

The average daily trading volume on the equities market in 2020 amounted to approximately NIS 1.9 billion, some 35% higher than the average volume in the years 2015–2019 (that amounted to approximately NIS 1.4 billion per day). The major contributor to the rise in trading volumes was global coronavirus pandemic, which reached Israel in February 2020, and led to a steep increase in trading volatility on the markets.

Growth in the number of retail accounts with Israeli members of TASE in 2020

The Israeli capital market was stormed by the local retail public in 2020, which opened a significantly greater number of new accounts with TASE members than in 2019. Some 141,000 new accounts were opened by the general public during 2020, compared to some 98,000 new accounts in 2019, a 44% increase. The pace at which non-bank members acquired new members – some 170% more than in 2019 – was particularly noticeable. Among the banks, the growth was 36% up on the previous year.

International agreements
In February 2007 the TASE signed a formal memorandum of understanding with the London Stock Exchange intended to smooth the trading of securities listed on both exchanges. At the time, 50 Israeli companies were listed on the London Stock Exchange. A similar memorandum of understanding was signed with The Nasdaq Stock Market in November 2007. NASDAQ at the time had 70 Israeli companies listed on the exchange, with a combined global market capitalization of over US$60 billion.

In July 2008, the TASE entered into a memorandum of understanding with NYSE Euronext. At the time seven Israeli companies traded on the NYSE.

 In November 2008 the TASE and the Shanghai Stock Exchange signed a memorandum of understanding, with delegations to be sent to each other's markets to deepen understanding and promote trade. In February 2010, the TASE and the Toronto Stock Exchange signed a memorandum of understanding, committing to the cultivation of stronger ties between the two exchanges.

Trading and features

Operating hours 
TASE only operates from Sunday through Thursday. TASE does not operate on Friday as it is a short workday. TASE also does not operate on Israeli national and religious holidays[2]. Every so often, the idea of changing the trading days is raised such that TASE would not operate on Sundays and would operate on Fridays. The reasons for proposing this change include the relatively low trading volume on Sundays, due mainly to the world's main stock exchanges not operating on Sundays.

The TASE trading schedule on workdays is divided into five phases: "Pre-opening", "Opening auction", "Continuous trading", "Pre-closing", and "Closing auction"

On the days when operations are conducted, trading is executed between the hours of 9:25 in the morning (derivatives – from 9:45) and 17:25 in the afternoon (and for derivatives – 17:35) local time (GMT+2).

Since March 8, 2020, trading on Sundays occasionally ends at between 15:49 and 15:50 local time (GMT+2). Correspondingly, derivatives trading on such Sundays ends 35 minutes earlier, viz. at 16:00 on local time (GMT+2).

Products 
Several financial products are traded on TASE:

 Equities: A security that represents a share of a company's ownership. 
 Bonds: A security that represents a loan granted to the issuer of the security, with pre-determined repayments terms and interest.
 Corporate bonds: bonds issued by a company.
 Government bonds: bonds issued by the state of Israel.
 "Makams" (T-Bills): Short-term bonds (up to one year) issued at a discount by the Bank of Israel. 
 Convertible bonds: a bond that is convertible into a share in consideration for a pre-determined payment (similar to an option) 
 Exchange Traded Notes (ETNs): a security that tracks the price of a product or a particular financial index in Israel or elsewhere in the world. There are ETNs that are calculated according to a formula that is associated with one or more indices. Thus, for example, there are short ETNs that move inversely in relation to a particular index (the note's value rises as the index falls, and vice versa).
 Exchange Traded Funds (ETFs): A financial instrument intended to passively track equity and commodity indices. The fund invests its money through linkage to a particular, pre-determined, index, without any discretion being exercised by the fund's management.

The fund does not guarantee a return linked to the movement in the index and the return for the investor can be higher or lower than the movement in the selected index, due to the fund's trading activity and the deviation (generally, small) in the composition of the fund's assets. Actually, an ETF is obligated to make its best effort to track the index and, as such, the ETF should generate a similar, if not an identical, return to the movement in the index that it tracks.

An ETF is a hybrid product, since it is listed on TASE like any other security listed on TASE and can be bought or sold on TASE. However, in addition to this, the investor has the possibility of buying or selling the ETF, in a similar fashion to open-end mutual funds (funds that are not listed on TASE). Like mutual funds, the ETF is subject to the Joint Investment Trusts Law.

 Mutual funds: A fund managed by an investment house that invests its money according to the decisions of the fund's management and according to a pre-published prospectus.
 Option warrants: A warrant entitling its holder to convert it into a share or a bond in consideration for a pre-determined payment. These are traded through the TACT system, in contrast to stock exchange derivatives, which are traded through the TACT-Derivatives system.
 The MAOF (a Hebrew acronym for "future and financial instruments") market – derivatives – options and future contracts on an index, individual securities (a bond or an equity) or exchange rates. TASE's MAOF Clearing House is a counterparty for every option, serving as a central clearing house; this is in contrast to option warrants which are a contract with a specific company. Every trader can write and purchase such securities. Options on the TA-35 Index are the product that is the most traded on TASE, with strong activity also taking place in shekel-dollar options. Derivatives are traded in the MAOF arena and have different trading byelaws from those for other assets traded through the regular TACT system (for example, on the MAOF system, prices are quoted in shekels, while on TACT they are quoted in agorot).
 TASE UP: a platform designed for private companies with the aim of allowing them to raise funds from institutional and accredited investors. The TASE UP platform is separate from the TASE trading platform for public companies and companies listed thereon remain private – not making an IPO, not having to report in accordance with the Securities Law and not being subject to the obligation of having to publish a prospectus when listing its securities.
 TASE Data Hub: The TASE Data Hub allows access to TASE's data systems. The system was launched, in 2020 and allows access to a broad range of data products relating to the Israeli capital market, using an API (Application Programming Interface) or through daily reports sent to the recipient's personal or organizational email. TASE's API provides access to TASE's databases and is customized to the end-customer's personal or organizational needs.

Fees 
TASE collects fees from its members on every transaction executed thereon, calculated in thousands of a percent of the asset value in the case of the TACT system and in tens of agorot per MAOF option unit.

Citizens interested in trading on TASE do so through the TASE members (the abovementioned banks and investment houses), which collect a considerably higher fee for their services from low-volume traders. The banks collect, using their default pricelist (0.6–0.8%), a fee that is 100–200 times higher than the TASE fee charged to them. It is usually possible to obtain a discount of tens of percent from the banking pricelist, just by asking, even if volumes are not significant (reducing the fee to 0.2–0.3%). The fee collected from low-volume traders by non-bank members (i.e., the investment houses) is lower (approximately 0.1%), only some 20 times higher than the TASE fee.

Significant-volume private and institutional traders receive a considerable discount from both the banks and the investment houses, so that the fees collected from the larger traders are at tariffs approaching the TASE pricelist.

Furthermore, the Israeli banks collect a range of different fees in relation to transactions with TASE, such as distribution fees for mutual funds and "custodianship fees", which is an archaic fee that very few of the investment houses continue to collect; it amounts to 0.1–0.2% annually and originates from the time when securities were actual paper documents that were kept in a safe for the bank's customers. In the digital world, the justification for this fee is less clear and most of TASE's non-bank members do not collect this fee from their customers; the banks too are tending to waive this fee for some of their customers. TASE publishes a fees comparison table on its website, which allows the different trading fees to be swiftly compared.

The companies listed on TASE 
During the 1960s, the scope of activity on TASE was limited and, in 1965, only 80 companies were listed on TASE. At the end of January 2021, 457 companies were listed on TASE with a total market cap of NIS 837 billion.

The TASE indices 

Since the Israeli stock exchange indices reform at the beginning of 2017, there have been two equity universes. The Rimon universe is the senior of the two and comprises some 230 shares that are suitable to be used as underlying assets for derivatives. Such shares have a higher value and more stringent threshold criteria in relation to the free float. The Tamar universe comprises some 350 shares, including smaller value shares as well as shares with a lower free float.

In addition to these, there are other market cap and sectoral indices, as well as government bond indices.

Regulation 
TASE's operations are governed by the Securities Law, 1968 and the Israel Securities Authority supervises its activity as well as enforcing the laws applicable to public companies. In order to be listed on TASE, a company is required to meet certain criteria, both at the time of making its offering and during the listing period; these criteria are grounded on the TASE Code and on temporary regulations. The TASE Code is intended to prescribe the rules for the equitable and proper conduct of TASE and is a document that is frequently updated in correlation with changes in the Israeli capital market.

Dual listing 
Reliefs were made to the law in 2000 pursuant to which some of the regulations imposed by the Securities Law on dual-listed companies were removed. Companies that are listed on another recognized stock exchange (a closed list of stock exchanges in advanced nations (the NASDAQ, the New York Stock Exchange (NYSE), the NYSE MKT (formerly, AMEX), and the London Stock Exchange's (LSE) Main Market and High Growth Segment) can easily and simply dual-list on TASE using the overseas reporting and regulatory format, with limited Israeli regulatory requirements. In addition, listing reliefs have been implemented for companies listed in Israel wishing to list on recognized overseas exchanges and changes have been made to the reporting regime accordingly.

In light of the ever-increasing interest from Israeli companies to also list on markets in the Far East, including Singapore and Hong Kong, due either to business links with these markets or to perceiving the attractiveness of these markets for fundraising, the Israel Securities Authority submitted a proposal that was approved by the Knesset Finance Committee in June 2018,pursuant to which the dual-listing arrangements were extended so as to include three additional stock exchanges: Singapore, Hong Kong and Toronto.

References

External links

 
Financial services companies established in 1953
Buildings and structures in Tel Aviv
Stock exchanges in Israel
Stock exchanges in the Middle East
1953 establishments in Israel
Buildings and structures completed in 1953
Companies based in Tel Aviv